The Parliamentary Under-Secretary of State for Pensions is a junior position in the Department for Work and Pensions in the British government.

Responsibilities 
The minister's responsibilities include:

Pensioner benefits, including new State Pension, Winter Fuel Payments, Pension Credit and Attendance Allowance
Private and occupational pensions, including regulatory powers and the National Employment Savings Trust (NEST)
Automatic enrolment into a workplace pension
Oversight of arms-length bodies, including the Pensions Regulator, Pension Protection Fund, Financial Assistance Scheme and Pensions Ombudsman
Financial guidance, budgeting, saving and debt, including the Money and Pensions Service and Financial Inclusion Policy Forum
Methods of payment and Post Office Card Accounts
EU Exit preparation relevant to pensions
Cross-DWP spokesperson – shadowing Lords

List of ministers

Notes

References 

Department for Work and Pensions
Ministerial offices in the United Kingdom